Kalvanin Kadhali is the debut Tamil-language novel by Kalki Krishnamurthy. It was serialised in the magazine Ananda Vikatan in 1937, and published in paperback form in 1954. The novel was adapted into a play staged in 1953, and a film released in 1955.

Plot summary

Background 
Drawing inspiration from a dacoit in Thanjavur, Kalki Krishnamurthy wrote a story titled Kalvanin Kadhali with the intention of making it a film. Unable to attract investors, he instead published the screenplay as a serial novel in the magazine Ananda Vikatan upon advice from S. S. Vasan.

Adaptations 
Kalvanin Kadhali was adapted into a play by the TKS Brothers and staged in 1953. It was also adapted into a film released in 1955.

References 

1937 novels
Indian crime novels
Indian novels adapted into films
Indian romance novels
Novels first published in serial form
Novels set in Tamil Nadu
Tamil novels